Judah ben-Jonah Jeitteles (March 1773 – 6 June 1838) was a Bohemian maskil and Hebrew writer.

Biography
Judah Jeitteles was born to prominent Jewish physician  in Prague, where he received a traditional Jewish education.

An advocate of education reform in Jewish schools (including for the abolition of ḥeders and for the integration of Jewish studies into the curricula of secular schools), Jeitteles was appointed supervisor of the German-language Jewish school in Prague around 1812. At the age of 40, he was elected one of four communal leaders of Prague's Jewish community, but later settled in Vienna.

He devoted himself to the study of Oriental languages and literature under the direction of his brother Baruch Jeitteles. He was the first to compose in Hebrew a grammar of Biblical Aramaic, its title being Mevo lashon Aramit (Prague, 1813). He edited and wrote commentaries on the books of Samuel, Kings, the Twelve Minor Prophets, Chronicles, Ezra, Nehemiah, and Daniel for Anton Edler von Schmid's new (fourth) edition of the Bible with German translation. He left in manuscript a complete Aramaic-German dictionary, which explains especially the root words of the Aramaicisms occurring in the Hebrew text of the Tanakh.

Bibliography

 
 
 
 
 
 
 
 
 
 
 
 
 
 
 
  With Max Emanuel Stern. Introduction by Judah Leib Ben-Ze'ev.

References
 

1773 births
1838 deaths
19th-century Austrian Jews
19th-century lexicographers
Bible commentators
Bohemian Jews
Czech lexicographers
Grammarians of Aramaic
Hebrew–German translators
Hebrew-language writers
Jewish Austrian writers
Jewish lexicographers
People of the Haskalah
School principals and headteachers
Writers from Prague
Writers from Vienna